Soignébougou is a village and rural commune in the Cercle of Ségou in the Ségou Region of southern-central Mali. The commune includes 8 villages in an area of approximately 81 square kilometers. In the 2009 census the population was 3,110. The village of Soignébougou, the chef-lieu of the commune, is 30 km southwest of Ségou.

References

External links
.

Communes of Ségou Region